A referendum on "the protection of national unity" was held in Egypt on 10 September 1981. It was approved by 99.5% of voters.

Results

References

Egypt
Protection of national unity referendum
Referendums in Egypt
Egyptian protection of national unity referendum